Chobiyal is a 2020 Bengali thriller drama film directed by Manas Basu and produced by Milan Dutta. This film is under the banner of Paramhansha Chitram. The film was released on 11 December 2020.

Plot
Habol is a photographer has a studio near a crematorium. He is passionate in taking pictures of dead bodies. He works with a senior photographer Kanak in various wedding photoshoots. One day when Kanak leaves the town, Labonya a mysterious housewife comes to Habol. He falls in love with Labonya and starts staying together. When Habol's friends ask about their relationship, he disappears with the mysterious lady from the area.

Cast
 Saswata Chatterjee as Habol
 Srabanti Chatterjee as Labonya
 Amitabh Bhattacharjee as Kanak
 Samiul alam
 Joyjit Banerjee
 Mallika Bandopadhyay

References

2020 films
Bengali-language Indian films
Indian thriller drama films